Thomas Gainsborough  (14 May 1727 (baptised) – 2 August 1788) was an English portrait and landscape painter, draughtsman, and printmaker. Along with his rival Sir Joshua Reynolds, he is considered one of the most important British artists of the second half of the 18th century. He painted quickly, and the works of his maturity are characterised by a light palette and easy strokes. Despite being a prolific portrait painter, Gainsborough gained greater satisfaction from his landscapes. He is credited (with Richard Wilson) as the originator of the 18th-century British landscape school. Gainsborough was a founding member of the Royal Academy.

Youth and training

He was born in Sudbury, Suffolk, the youngest son of John Gainsborough, a weaver and maker of woollen goods, and his wife Mary, the sister of the Reverend Humphry Burroughs. One of Gainsborough's brothers, Humphrey, had a faculty for mechanics and was said to have invented the method of condensing steam in a separate vessel, which was of great service to James Watt; another brother, John, was known as Scheming Jack because of his passion for designing curiosities.

The artist spent his childhood at what is now Gainsborough's House, on Gainsborough Street, Sudbury. He later resided there, following the death of his father in 1748 and before his move to Ipswich. The building still survives and is now a house-museum dedicated to his life and art.

When he was still a boy he impressed his father with his drawing and painting skills, and by the time he was ten years old he had almost certainly painted heads and small landscapes, including a miniature self-portrait. Gainsborough was allowed to leave home in 1740 to study art in London, where he trained under engraver Hubert Gravelot but became associated with William Hogarth and his school. He assisted Francis Hayman in the decoration of the supper boxes at Vauxhall Gardens, and contributed one image to the decoration of what is now the Thomas Coram Foundation for Children.

Career

Suffolk
In 1746, Gainsborough married Margaret Burr, an illegitimate daughter of the Duke of Beaufort, who had settled a £200 annuity on her. The artist's work, then mostly consisting of landscape paintings, was not selling well. He returned to Sudbury in 1748–1749 and concentrated on painting portraits. 
While still in Suffolk, Gainsborough painted a portrait of The Rev. John Chafy Playing a Violoncello in a Landscape (c.1750–1752; Tate Gallery, London).

In 1752, he and his family, now including two daughters, Mary ("Molly", 1750–1826) and Margaret ("Peggy", 1751–1820), moved to Ipswich. Commissions for portraits increased, but his clients included mainly local merchants and squires. He had to borrow against his wife's annuity. Toward the end of his time in Ipswich, he painted a self-portrait, now in the permanent collection of the National Portrait Gallery, London.

Bath

In 1759, Gainsborough and his family moved to Bath, living at number 17 The Circus. There, he studied portraits by van Dyck and was eventually able to attract a fashionable clientele. In 1761, he began to send work to the Society of Arts exhibition in London (now the Royal Society of Arts, of which he was one of the earliest members); and from 1769 he submitted works to the Royal Academy's annual exhibitions. The exhibitions helped him enhance his reputation, and he was invited to become a founding member of the Royal Academy in 1769. His relationship with the academy was not an easy one and he stopped exhibiting his paintings in 1773.

Despite Gainsborough's increasing popularity and success in painting portraits for fashionable society, he expressed frustration during his Bath period at the demands of such work and that it prevented him from pursuing his preferred artistic interests. In a letter to a friend in the 1760s Gainsborough wrote: "I'm sick of Portraits and wish very much to take my Viol da Gamba and walk off to some sweet Village where I can paint Landskips [landscapes] and enjoy the fag End of Life in quietness and ease".  Of the men he had to deal with as patrons and admirers, and their pretensions, he wrote:... damn Gentlemen, there is not such a set of Enemies to a real artist in the world as they are, if not kept at a proper distance.  They think ... that they reward your merit by their Company & notice; but I ... know that they have but one part worth looking at, and that is their Purse; their Hearts are seldom near enough the right place to get a sight of it.Gainsborough was so keen a viol da gamba player that he had at this stage five of the instruments, three made by Henry Jaye and two by Barak Norman.

London

In 1774, Gainsborough and his family moved to London to live in Schomberg House, Pall Mall. A commemorative blue plaque was put on the house in 1951. In 1777, he again began to exhibit his paintings at the Royal Academy, including portraits of contemporary celebrities, such as the Duke and Duchess of Cumberland. Exhibitions of his work continued for the next six years. About this time, Gainsborough began experimenting with printmaking using the then-novel techniques of aquatint and soft-ground etching.

During the 1770s and 1780s Gainsborough developed a type of portrait in which he integrated the sitter into the landscape. An example of this is his portrait of Frances Browne, Mrs John Douglas (1746–1811) which can be seen at Waddesdon Manor. The sitter has withdrawn to a secluded and overgrown corner of a garden to read a letter, her pose recalling the traditional representation of Melancholy. Gainsborough emphasised the relationship between Mrs Douglas and her environment by painting the clouds behind her and the drapery billowing across her lap with similar silvery violet tones and fluid brushstrokes. This portrait was included in his first private exhibition at Schomberg House in 1784.

In 1776, Gainsborough painted a portrait of Johann Christian Bach, the youngest son of Johann Sebastian Bach. Bach's former teacher Padre Martini of Bologna, Italy, was assembling a collection of portraits of musicians, and Bach asked Gainsborough to paint his portrait as part of this collection. The portrait now hangs in the National Portrait Gallery in London.

In 1780, he painted the portraits of King George III and Queen Charlotte and afterwards received other royal commissions.  In February 1780, his daughter Molly was married to his musician friend Johann Christian Fischer, to Gainsborough's dismay, as he realized that Fischer was forming an attachment to Molly while carrying on flirtation with Peggy. The marriage between Molly and Fischer only lasted 8 months due to their discord and Fischer's deceit.

In 1784, Principal Painter in Ordinary Allan Ramsay died and the King was obliged to give the job to Gainsborough's rival and Academy president, Joshua Reynolds. Gainsborough remained the Royal Family's favorite painter, however.

In his later years, Gainsborough often painted landscapes. With Richard Wilson, he was one of the originators of the eighteenth-century British landscape school; though simultaneously, in conjunction with Reynolds, he was the dominant British portraitist of the second half of the 18th century.

William Jackson in his contemporary essays said of him "to his intimate friends he was sincere and honest and that his heart was always alive to every feeling of honour and generosity". Gainsborough did not particularly enjoy reading but letters written to his friends were penned in such an exceptional conversational manner that the style could not be equalled. As a letter writer Henry Bate-Dudley said of him "a selection of his letters would offer the world as much originality and beauty as is ever traced in his paintings".

In the 1780s, Gainsborough used a device he called a "Showbox" to compose landscapes and display them backlit on glass. The original box is on display in the Victoria & Albert Museum with a reproduction transparency.

He died of cancer on 2 August 1788 at the age of 61. According to his daughter Peggy, his last words were "van Dyck". He is interred in the churchyard St Anne's Church, Kew, Surrey, (located on Kew Green). It was his express wish to be buried near his friend Joshua Kirby. Later his wife and nephew Gainsborough Dupont were interred with him. Coincidentally Johan Zoffany and Franz Bauer are also buried in the graveyard. As of 2011, an appeal is underway to pay the costs of restoration of his tomb. A street in Kew, Gainsborough Road, is named after him.

Technique

The art historian Michael Rosenthal described Gainsborough as "one of the most technically proficient and, at the same time, most experimental artists of his time". He was noted for the speed with which he applied paint, and he worked more from observations of nature (and of human nature) than from application of formal academic rules. The poetic sensibility of his paintings caused Constable to say, "On looking at them, we find tears in our eyes and know not what brings them."

Gainsborough's enthusiasm for landscapes is shown in the way he merged figures of the portraits with the scenes behind them.  His landscapes were often painted at night by candlelight, using a tabletop arrangement of stones, pieces of mirrors, broccoli, and the like as a model. His later work was characterised by a light palette and easy, economical strokes.

Gainsborough's only known assistant was his nephew, Gainsborough Dupont.

Reputation

His more famous works, The Blue Boy; Mr and Mrs Andrews; Portrait of Mrs. Graham; Mary and Margaret: The Painter's Daughters; William Hallett and His Wife Elizabeth, nee Stephen, known as The Morning Walk; and Cottage Girl with Dog and Pitcher, display the unique individuality of his subjects. Joshua Reynolds considered Girl with Pigs "the best picture he (Gainsborough) ever painted or perhaps ever will".

Gainsborough's works became popular with collectors from the 1850s on, after Lionel de Rothschild began buying his portraits. The rapid rise in the value of pictures by Gainsborough and also by Reynolds in the mid 19th century was partly because the Rothschild family, including Ferdinand de Rothschild began collecting them.

In 2011, Gainsborough's portrait of Miss Read (Mrs Frances Villebois) was sold by Michael Pearson, 4th Viscount Cowdray, for a record price of £6.54M, at Christie's in London. She was a matrilineal descendant of Cecily Neville, Duchess of York.

Popular culture
 Gainsborough's portrait The Blue Boy is shown in the 1988 comedy movie The Naked Gun: From the Files of Police Squad! in the office of the antagonist, Mr Ludwig. 
 Cecil Beaton's play Gainsborough's Girls is set in London in 1774 when the painter moved his family to the capital. Previously unpublished, it received its first performance in Sudbury, Suffolk in 2019, followed by a short run at the Tower Theatre, London.
 Simon Edge's comic novel A Right Royal Face-Off focuses on Gainsborough's relationship with King George III and his family, and his rivalry with Joshua Reynolds.
 Stanley Kubrick was inspired by Gainsborough's paintings, amongst other artists of the 18th century, in creating the look and mannerisms for his 1975 film Barry Lyndon.
 Gainsborough's portrait The Morning Walk (Portrait of Mr and Mrs William Hallett) is clearly visible over actor Daniel Craig's shoulder during a scene in the 2012 James Bond film Skyfall set in the National Gallery.

Gallery

See also
 Gainsborough's House
 Fancy picture
 Rococo
 Humphrey Gainsborough
 Holywells Park

Further reading
 Thomas Gainsborough, William T. Whitley, (John Murray, 1915)
 Gainsborough, Ellis Waterhouse, (Edward Hulton, 1958) – the standard catalogue of the portraits etc.
 The Letters of Thomas Gainborough, ed. Mary Woodall, (Cupid Press, 1963)
 The Drawings of Thomas Gainsborough, John Hayes, (Two volumes, Zwemmer, 1970) – the standard catalogue of the drawings
 Gainsborough as Printmaker, John Hayes, (Zwemmer, 1971) – the standard catalogue of the prints
 Gainsborough, John Hayes, (Phaidon, 1975)
 Gainsborough & Reynolds in the British Museum, ed. Timothy Clifford, Antony Grffiths and Martin Royalton-Kisch, (BMP, 1978)
 Thomas Gainborough, John Hayes, (Tate Gallery, 1981)
 The Landscape Paintings of Thomas Gainsborough, John Hayes (Two volumes, Sotheby's, 1982) – the standard catalogue on the landscape paintings
 Thomas Gainsborough: His Life and Art, Jack Lindsay, (HarperCollins, 1982)
 A Nest of Nightingales: Thomas Gainsborough, The Linley Sisters. Paintings and their Context II, ed. Giles Waterfield, (Dulwich PIcture Gallery, 1988)
 The Paintings of Thomas Gainborough, Malcolm Cormack, (Cambridge University Press, 1991)
 Gainsborough & Reynolds: Contrasts in Royal Patronage, exhibition catalogue, (Queen's Gallery, 1994)
 Gainsborough's Vision, Amal Asfour and Paul Williamson (Liverpool University Press, 1999)
 The Art of Thomas Gainborough: A little business for the Eye, Michael Rosenthal, (Yale University Press, 1999)
 The Letters of Thomas Gainsborough, ed. John Hayes (Yale University Press, 2001)
 Gainsborough, eds. Michael Rosenthal and Martin Myrone, (Tate, 2002)
 Gainsborough in Bath, Susan Sloman, (Yale University Press, 2002)
 Gainsborough, William Vaughan, (World of Art, Thames & Hudson, 2002) – the most accessible introduction
 Sensation & Sensibility: Viewing Gainsborough's Cottage Door, ed. Ann Bermingham (Yale University Press, 2005)
 Thomas Gainsborough's First Self-portrait, Stephen Conrad, in The British Art Journal, Vol. XII, No. 1, Summer 2011, pp. 52–59
 Thomas Gainsborough and the Modern Woman, ed. Benedict Leca, (Giles, 2011)
 Gainsborough's Landscapes: Themes and Variations, Susan Sloman, (Philip Wilson, 2012)
 Gainsborough: A Portrait, James Hamilton, (W&N, 13 July 2017)

References

External links

 
Gainsborough at the Government Art Collection
Thomas Gainsborough's works of art at Waddesdon Manor
Ellis Waterhouse archive
John Hayes archive; research papers of John Hayes, British art historian and a leading authority on Thomas Gainsborough

 
1727 births
1788 deaths
People from Sudbury, Suffolk
Burials at St. Anne's Church, Kew
18th-century English painters
18th-century English male artists
English male painters
Royal Academicians
English portrait painters
Landscape artists
Rococo painters
Deaths from cancer in England
People educated at Sudbury Grammar School
Waddesdon Manor